Monica Piga Wallace is an attorney and politician from New York State, elected to the New York State Assembly from the 143rd assembly district. The district comprises the entirety of the towns of Cheektowaga and Lancaster. She is a Democrat. Wallace was elected in 2016, defeated Republican opponent Russell Sugg 54–45 percent to succeed Angela Wozniak who did not seek re-election.

Originally from Long Island, Wallace attended SUNY Binghamton as an undergraduate and later received a J.D. from SUNY Buffalo Law School. She served as a clerk to Judge Richard Arcara and taught as a legal writing professor at SUNY Buffalo Law School. She also practiced law as an attorney for Phillips Lytle LLP.

Wallace resides in the town of Lancaster with her husband and two children.

References

Year of birth missing (living people)
Living people
Democratic Party members of the New York State Assembly
Women state legislators in New York (state)
21st-century American women politicians
21st-century American politicians
People from Lancaster, New York
Binghamton University alumni
University at Buffalo Law School alumni